Bhawanigarh, earlier known as Dhode, is a town and a municipal council (Class-3) in the Sangrur district in the state of Punjab, India. It is also the headquarters of Bhawanigarh tehsil, which was formed in December 2016. The town is also called Dhode, after the clan of its original founders. The town lies 19 kilometres east of Sangrur on the Patiala-Sangrur road whereas Patiala is 39 kilometres east of Bhawanigarh. The literacy rate is higher than other places of Sangrur. Bhawanigarh is divided into 15 wards. The Bhawanigarh block consists of 66 villages in the Sangrur district.

History 

The name Bhawanigarh originates from "Bhawani" mata, the Hindu goddess.  There is a temple of Bhawani mata in the town. Earlier, the town was known as Dhode and was a tehsil of Karamgarh nizamat of Patiala Princely State. Till 1919, Bhawanigarh was the headquarter of Karamgarh, later the headquarters were shifted to Sunam. The town was named "Dhode" after the clan of Jats of Dhodan, a sub-clan of Bajha clan. The town received status of municipal committee in 1945. In December 2016, Sukhbir Singh Badal, then Deputy Chief Minister of Punjab announced sub-division and tehsil status to Bhawanigarh.

Administration 
The Bhawanigarh sub-division of Sangrur district consists of 66 villages, and a total population of 104,507 people.

Local government 
The city is governed by a civic administration or local government headed by Sub-Divisional Magistrate Vineet Kumar and President Sukhjit Kaur Ghabadiya. The town comprises 15 wards represented by 15 elected councillors.

Geography

Demographics 

As of 2011 India census, Bhawanigarh has population of 22,320 out of which 11,780 are males whereas females are 10,540. Population of children (age:0-6) is 2422 which is 10.85% of total. Female Sex Ratio of Bhawanigarh is 895 whereas child sex ratio is 862. literacy rate of Bhawanigarh is 77.56% which is higher than state average. In Bhawanigarh, Male literacy is around 82.60% while female literacy rate is 71.95%.

Economy

Places of interest

Gurduara Sahib Patshahi Nauvi 

Guru Tegh Bahadur stayed here during one of his journeys through the Malwa country.  The original memorial on the spot where the guru had stayed was in time developed into a gurdwara called Gurudwara Sahib Patshahi Nauvi. Gurudwara Patshahi Nauvi Sabhib is situated in the Bhawanigarh Town in District Sangrur. Guru Tegh Bahadur accepting the invitation of King of Assam, started journey from Shri Anandpur Sahib along with the 300 sangat and carrying necessary commodities for 3 years journey visited this place and stayed here for 2 days. On his two days stay Guru Sahib used perform kirtan darbar here. From here they resumed the journey via Phaguwal, Gharancho and Ghanour. With Guru Sahib's blessings peoples wishes are fulfilled here.

The present gurudwara, consisting of a rectangular hall in front of a semi-octagonal sanctum with verandahs on three sides, was constructed in 1916CE. A small sarovar was added in the 1980s. The gurdwara owns  of agricultural land and is now managed directly by the Shiromani Gurdwara Prabandhak Committee. The gurudwara's budget for 1990-91 shows rental income from land alone as Rs. 210,000.

Bhawanigarh Fort 

Bhawanigarh Fort was built by Maharaja Aala Singh of Patiala in 1749 for their defense. In 1781, Sahib Singh became king of Patiala at age of seven. In 1794, Marathas attacked Punjab and fought against Rani Sahib Kaur's force and finally Marathas lost the war. But because of some traitors Rani Sahib Kaur was imprisoned in Bhawanigarh Fort by Maharaja Sahib Singh. Rani escaped from the fort and lived in Ubhawal and died there in 1799.

Shri Guru Teg Bahadur Stadium 

Shri Guru Teg Bahadur Stadium situated near the police station. It is of approximately 5 acres in area. The stadium was built under the construction budget of  ₹2.5 crore.

Radha Krishna Temple

Transportation 

Bhawanigarh is settled along the National Highway 7. The town is well linked to Sangrur, Patiala, Sunam, Rajpura, Chandigarh, Mansa, and Bathinda through the road. The town is connected to Nabha through state highway SH 12A while is also connected to Samana.

The town consists of two bus stands generally known as "Old Bus Stand" and "New Bus Stand". Though the town lies on national highway has good bus service and the most of buses including public and private have two bus stops in the town. The construction of the "New Bus Stand" costing around ₹2.5 crore was completed in 2021, and it was inaugurated by Vijay Inder Singla in January 2021.

Educational Institutions 

As per Census of 2011, there are 14 primary schools, 6 middle schools, 2 secondary, 2 senior secondary schools, and one arts/science college in the town.

Guru Nanak Convent School 
Guru Nanak Convent School, is one of the oldest institution of city Bhawanigarh. It was established by M.S. Toor and the founder principal was Paramjit Kaur. This institution is a Sikh minority community institution, situated in middle of the city near old bus stand, Bhawanigarh.  This institution serves students to study form elementary classes to senior secondary classes under affiliation from Central Board of Secondary Education.  Guru Nanak Convent School bears 'A' Grade Accreditation from Ministry of Education Govt. of India.

Guru Nanak Institute of Management and Technology 
This institution is affiliated to Lovely Professional University, Jalandhar for Distance Education Programmes. People may opt for many courses under the streams Art, Commerce, Computer Science, Information and technology, Management and Library Sciences.

Guru Tegh Bhadur College 
This institution is affiliated to Punjabi University Patiala, it offers all the courses under stream Arts and computer sciences. This is the oldest college in the town, it was established by Mehma Singh Grewal, it is run by a charitable trust.

Notable people 
 Narinder Kaur Bharaj, current MLA of Sangrur, from Bharaj village of Bhawanigarh block
 Parkash Chand Garg, former MLA of Sangrur from 2012 to 2017

Notes

References

Cities and towns in Sangrur district